Miguel Solano (born 29 October 1946) is a Spanish rower. He competed in the men's coxed pair event at the 1968 Summer Olympics.

References

1946 births
Living people
Spanish male rowers
Olympic rowers of Spain
Rowers at the 1968 Summer Olympics
Place of birth missing (living people)